Robadje is a village in northern Croatia, part of the Štrigova municipality within Međimurje County. The village is located at the border with Slovenia.

History

An urbarium from year 1672 mentions a vineyard on Strmec hill (Vinea in monte Stermecz). The vineyard was in possession of Zrinski noble family.

Tkalec Manor, most notable building in village, was built in 18th century by  Paulines from Štrigova. Manor is located on Kalec hill and is surrounded by vineyards.

Geography

Robadje is located in part of Međimurje called Gornje Međimurje. Robadje is about 23 kilometres northwest from Čakovec, and some 110 kilometres north of Zagreb.

Landscape of Robadje consist of low hills called Međimurske gorice, covered with vineyards, orchards and woodlands. Mađerkin breg, popular viewpoint, is located in Robadje.
Robadje had a population of 159 in 2011 census. Robadje is experiencing population decline since the 1980s.

References

Footnotes

Citations

Populated places in Međimurje County